David Brooks (born 24 May 1962) is an Australian former professional rugby league footballer who played in the 1980s and 1990s. A one-club man, Brooks played his entire first-grade career with the Balmain Tigers in the New South Wales Rugby League premiership.

Playing career
While attending McCarthy Catholic High School in Tamworth, Brooks played for the Australian Schoolboys team in 1979.

Brooks made his first grade debut for Balmain in round 1 of the 1983 season against South Sydney at Leichhardt Oval.  Brooks ended his debut season as the club's top point scorer.

Brooks was selected to represent New South Wales as a second-rower for Game III of the 1985 State of Origin series.
  
Over the next few seasons, Balmain would feature regularly in the finals and in 1988 the club reached their first grand final since 1969.  Brooks played at second-row in the club's 24-12 grand final loss against Canterbury-Bankstown at the Sydney Football Stadium.

Balmain would reach the grand final the following season against the Canberra Raiders but Brooks did not play in the finals series or the grand final itself.  In 1990, Balmain reached what would be their last finals series with Brooks playing in the elimination semi-final which Balmain lost 0–16 against Manly-Warringah.

Brooks final game as a player came in 1992 in the reserve grade grand final against North Sydney which Balmain lost 28–14 at the Sydney Football Stadium.

References

Sources

External links
David Brooks at nrlstats.com

1962 births
Living people
Australian rugby league players
Balmain Tigers players
New South Wales Rugby League State of Origin players
Country New South Wales rugby league team players
City New South Wales rugby league team players
Rugby league players from New South Wales
Rugby league second-rows